Savaş Kaya (born June 2, 1986) is a Turkish boxer.

Amateur
Savaş Kaya won silver medal the 2005 Mediterranean Games

Professional boxing record

External links
 
Euro 2006

1986 births
Living people
Super-middleweight boxers
Turkish male boxers
Mediterranean Games silver medalists for Turkey
Competitors at the 2005 Mediterranean Games
Mediterranean Games medalists in boxing
21st-century Turkish people